North Carolina's 3rd Senate district is one of 50 districts in the North Carolina Senate. It has been represented by Republican Bobby Hanig since 2023.

Geography
Since 2023, the district has included all of Warren, Northampton, Halifax, Martin, Bertie, Hertford, Gates, Camden, Currituck,  and Tyrrell counties. The district overlaps with the 1st, 5th, 23rd, and 27th house districts.

District officeholders since 1991

Election results

2022

2020

2018

2016

2014

2012

2010

2008

2006

2004

2002

2000

References

North Carolina Senate districts
Warren County, North Carolina
Northampton County, North Carolina
Halifax County, North Carolina
Martin County, North Carolina
Bertie County, North Carolina
Hertford County, North Carolina
Gates County, North Carolina
Camden County, North Carolina
Currituck County, North Carolina
Tyrrell County, North Carolina